The Miami-Dade Fire Rescue Department (MDFR) provides fire protection and emergency medical services to the unincorporated parts of Miami-Dade County, Florida, along with 30 municipalities located within the county.

The R. David Paulison Fire Rescue Headquarters is located in Doral.

Air Rescue 
The Miami-Dade Fire Rescue (MDFR) Air Rescue Bureau provides regional air medical services, search and rescue, aerial firefighting and tactical support to MDFR operations, to those of local municipalities and government agencies at the state and federal level.

MDFR helicopters transport severely injured trauma patients to state approved Level I trauma centers. Flight crews are trained in additional tactical disciplines necessary to deploy personnel and equipment in search and rescue missions, firefighting operations and reconnaissance on large incidents such as wildland fires and catastrophic events.

Current Fleet 

Air Rescue operates four Agusta Westland AW139 helicopters. Each aircraft is equipped with the following:
 Patient loading systems normally configured allow the transport of two critical-care patients, with the option to reconfigure for up to six patients in Mass Casualty Incidents (MCIs).
 An external hoist for helicopter-borne rescues.
 An external high-power searchlight, "The Night Sun," is used for night operations.
 MCI Command and Control suitable radio suite.
 Night Vision Goggle compatible lighting.
During the dry season, each aircraft can be configured with a Bambi Bucket for firefighting / water-operations.

All four helicopters are housed at MDFR fire stations located at both Miami Executive Airport and Miami-Opa Locka Executive Airport.

https://www.leonardocompany.com/en/news-and-stories-detail/-/detail/the-aw139-in-support-of-the-miami-dade-fire-rescue-missions

Urban Search And Rescue (USAR) 
  The Miami-Dade Fire Department is the founding member of one of Florida's two FEMA Urban Search and Rescue Task Force.  Florida Task Force 1 (FL-TF1) is available to respond to natural or man-made disasters around the county and world and assist with search and rescue, medical support, damage assessment and communications.

History

In the early 1980s two fire departments, Miami-Dade Fire Rescue (at that time known as Metro-Dade Fire Rescue) and the Fairfax County Fire & Rescue Department, operated under an agreement with the Office of Foreign Disaster Assistance (OFDA) of the U.S. State Department to provide international search and rescue assistance in times of disaster.  During these early years, assistance was provided to the countries of Mexico, Philippines and Soviet Armenia.

In 1991, FEMA incorporated a US&R team concept into a federal response plan. Over 20 teams were geographically chosen throughout the country, with local public safety departments as sponsoring agencies.  Today, under the Department of Homeland Security (DHS)  there are 28 national task forces staffed and equipped to provide 24-hour search and rescue operations following earthquakes, tornadoes, floods, hurricanes and other natural or human-caused disasters.

Responses
 Earthquakes  1985 Mexico City    1986 El Salvador    1988 Armenia    1990 Philippines    1997 Venezuela  1999 Colombia  1999 Turkey    1999 Taiwan     2010 Haiti
 Hurricanes / Weather Disasters  1988  Gilbert, Jamaica      1989 Hugo, Eastern Caribbean     1992 Andrew, Miami      1995 Luis, Caribbean      1995 Marilyn, Caribbean      1995 Opal, North Florida     2000 Belize    2004 Charley, Charlotte County, Florida   2005 Katrina, New Orleans, Louisiana  2008  Gustav, Texas      2008 Ike, Miami-Dade County, Florida
 Flooding/Weather Disasters  2000     Mozambique
 Building Explosions  1995 Oklahoma City     1996  Columbo, Sri Lanka      1996 Puerto Rico     2001 Pentagon, Washington, D.C.      2001 World Trade Center, New York
 Airplane Crash  1995-96 American Airlines Flight 965,  Buga, Colombia - 1996 ValuJet Flight 592, Florida
 Communications Support  1989 Romania     1991 Northern Iraq & Turkey    1994 Rwanda     1994 Haiti    1995 Montserrat     1995 Sierra Leone     1996 Bosnia     1998 Nairobi, Kenya
 Building Collapse  2007 Barbados,    2012 Doral, FL, 2021 Surfside condominium building collapse

Stations and Apparatus

The MDFR has 71 stations split up in 14 battalions. There are 2 additional stations under construction and one in a location To Be Determined

References

External links

Ambulance services in the United States
County government agencies in Florida
Fire departments in Florida
Government of Miami-Dade County, Florida
Medical and health organizations based in Florida